Crump Island is an island off the northeast coast of Antigua. It is located to the southeast of Guana Island in Belfast Bay, close to the town of Seaton's.

References

Islands of Antigua and Barbuda
Saint Philip Parish, Antigua and Barbuda